Péter Varjú (20 December 1982 in Szeged) is a Hungarian mathematician that works in harmonic analysis and ergodic theory.

He did his undergraduate studies at the University of Szeged and his doctoral studies at Princeton University, where he defended his thesis Random walks and spectral gaps in linear groups in 2011 under the supervision of Jean Bourgain. He works at the University of Cambridge.

He studied the construction of expander graphs with number-theoretic methods involving arithmetic groups and questions about the uniform distribution of random walks in arithmetic groups with Bourgain and in Euclidean isometries with Elon Lindenstrauss.

He received the 2016 EMS Prize and the 2018 Whitehead Prize.  He was also a Fulbright fellow.

References

External links 
 Homepage in Cambridge
 Varju, Fulbright Fellow

Living people
1982 births
People from Szeged
20th-century Hungarian mathematicians
21st-century Hungarian mathematicians
Princeton University alumni
Cambridge mathematicians